Julia is a 1977 American Holocaust drama film directed by Fred Zinnemann, from a screenplay by Alvin Sargent. It is based on a chapter from Lillian Hellman's 1973 book Pentimento about the author's relationship with a lifelong friend, Julia, who fought against the Nazis in the years prior to World War II.  The film stars Jane Fonda, Vanessa Redgrave, Jason Robards, Hal Holbrook, Rosemary Murphy, Maximilian Schell and Meryl Streep (in her film debut).

Julia was released theatrically on October 2, 1977 by 20th Century Fox. The film received generally positive reviews from critics and grossed $20.7 million against its $7 million budget. It received a leading 11 nominations at the 50th Academy Awards, including Best Picture, and won three awards: Best Supporting Actor (for Robards), Best Supporting Actress (for Redgrave) and Best Adapted Screenplay. 
At the 35th Golden Globe Awards it received a leading seven nominations, including for the Best Motion Picture – Drama, with Fonda and Redgrave winning for Best Actress and Best Supporting Actress, respectively. The film also received a leading ten nominations at the 32nd British Academy Film Awards and won four: Best Film, Best Actress (for Fonda), Best Screenplay, and Best Cinematography.

Plot
The young Lillian Hellman and her friend Julia, daughter of a wealthy family being brought up by her grandparents in the United States, enjoy a childhood together and an extremely close relationship in late adolescence. Later, while medical student/physician Julia attends Oxford and the University of Vienna and studies with such luminaries as Sigmund Freud,  Lillian, a struggling writer, suffers through revisions of her play with her mentor and sometime lover, famed author Dashiell Hammett, at a beach house.

Julia's school in Vienna is overrun by Nazi thugs, and Julia is severely injured trying to protect her colleagues.  Lillian receives word of Julia's condition and rushes to Vienna to be with her.  Julia is taken away for "treatment", and Lillian is unable to find her again since the hospital denies any knowledge of her being treated there.  She remains in Europe to try to find Julia again but is unsuccessful.

Later, during the Nazi era, Lillian has become a celebrated playwright and is invited to a writers' conference in the USSR. Julia, having taken on the battle against Nazism, enlists Lillian en route to smuggle money into Nazi Germany to assist the anti-Nazi cause. It is a dangerous mission, especially for a Jewish intellectual on her way to Russia.

Lillian departs for the USSR via Berlin, and the movements of her person, and placement of her possessions (a hat and a box of candy), are carefully guided by compatriots of Julia through border crossings and inspections. In Berlin, Lillian is told to go to a cafe where she finds Julia. They are able to speak only briefly. Julia divulges that the "treatment" she received in the hospital in Vienna was the amputation of her leg.  Julia tells her that the money she has brought will save 500 to 1,000 people, many of them Jews. Lillian also learns that Julia has a daughter, Lily, who is living with a baker in Alsace. After Lilian leaves Julia in the cafe and boards the train to Moscow, a man tells her to avoid passing through Germany again after she leaves the USSR.

When Lillian reaches London, she receives word that Julia has been killed in the Frankfurt apartment of a friend by Nazi agents although the details of her death are shrouded in secrecy. Lillian unsuccessfully looks for Julia's daughter in Alsace. She returns to the United States and is reunited with Dashiell Hammett.  She is haunted by her memories of Julia and is distraught over not having found Julia's baby.  She is shocked that Julia's family pretends not to remember Lillian, clearly wanting to excise from their memory a granddaughter who refused to conform at a time when conformity caused the murder of many innocent people.

The film ends with an image of Lillian Hellman seated in a boat alone, fishing.  She reveals in voiceover that she continued to live with Hammett for another thirty years and outlived him by several more.

Cast

The film marked the film debut of Meryl Streep and Lisa Pelikan.

Production
The film was shot on location in England and France. Although Lillian Hellman claimed the story was based on true events that occurred early in her life, the filmmakers later came to believe that most of it was fictionalized. Director Fred Zinnemann would later comment, "Lillian Hellman in her own mind owned half the Spanish Civil War, while Hemingway owned the other half. She would portray herself in situations that were not true. An extremely talented, brilliant writer, but she was a phony character, I'm sorry to say. My relations with her were very guarded and ended in pure hatred."

The 1977 film Julia was based on the "Julia" chapter of Hellman's memoir Pentimento. On June 30, 1976, as the film was going into production, Hellman wrote about the screenplay to its producer:

In a 1979 television interview with Dick Cavett, author Mary McCarthy, long Hellman's political adversary and the object of her negative literary judgment, said of Hellman that "every word she writes is a lie, including 'and' and 'the'." Hellman responded by filing a US$2,500,000 defamation suit against McCarthy, interviewer Dick Cavett, and PBS. McCarthy produced evidence she said proved that Hellman had lied in some accounts of her life. Cavett said he sympathized more with McCarthy than Hellman in the lawsuit, but "everybody lost" as a result of it. Norman Mailer attempted unsuccessfully to mediate the dispute through an open letter he published in the New York Times. At the time of her death in 1984, Hellman was still in litigation with McCarthy; her executors dropped the suit.

In 1983, New York psychiatrist Muriel Gardiner had become involved in the libel suit between McCarthy and Hellman. She claimed to be the model for the character named Julia in Pentimento, and in the movie Julia based on a chapter of that book. Hellman, who never met Gardiner, said that "Julia" was somebody else.

Gardiner wrote that, while she never met Hellman, she had often heard about her from her friend Wolf Schwabacher, who was Hellman's lawyer. By Gardiner's account, Schwabacher had visited Gardiner in Vienna. After Muriel Gardiner and Joseph Buttinger moved into their house at Brookdale Farm in Pennington, New Jersey in 1940, they divided the house in two. They rented half of it to Wolf and Ethel Schwabacher for more than ten years.

Many people believe that Hellmann based her story on Gardiner's life. Gardiner's editor cited the unlikelihood that there were two millionaire American women who were medical students in Vienna in the late 1930s.

Reception
The film earned $7.5 million in North American rentals.

It currently holds a 76% rating on Rotten Tomatoes from 29 reviews.

The response varied from positive to mixed, usually praising the period setting and acting, but criticizing the script and failure to adequately portray the friendship between the two leads. Variety gave it a positive review, praising Jane Fonda and Vanessa Redgrave as being "dynamite together on the screen," Richard Roth's production as "handsome and tasteful," as well as the period costumes and production design.

Roger Ebert called the film a "fascinating story," but felt the movie suffered from being told by Lillian Hellman's point of view. "The film never really establishes a relationship between the two women," he wrote. "It's awkward, the way the movie has to suspend itself between Julia – its ostensible subject – and Lillian Hellman, its real subject." He gave it two and a half out of four stars.

John Simon said of Julia- "Very little of what happens in the film is intrinsically interesting".

TV Guide gave it three out of five stars and declared it "Beautifully crafted, nominated for eleven Academy Awards, a big hit at the box office--and a dramatic dud ... If you like red nail polish, faux-cynicism, painfully brave smiles and European train stations, Julia may be your kind of cocktail."

Awards and nominations

After Redgrave was nominated for Best Supporting Actress, the Jewish Defense League objected to her nomination because she had narrated and helped fund a documentary entitled The Palestinian, which supported a Palestinian state. They also picketed the Oscar ceremony.

Notes

References

External links
 
 
 
 
 
 

1977 films
1977 drama films
20th Century Fox films
American drama films
Best Film BAFTA Award winners
British drama films
Films shot at EMI-Elstree Studios
Films scored by Georges Delerue
Films about the German Resistance
Films based on American novels
Films directed by Fred Zinnemann
Films featuring a Best Drama Actress Golden Globe-winning performance
Films featuring a Best Supporting Actor Academy Award-winning performance
Films featuring a Best Supporting Actress Academy Award-winning performance
Films featuring a Best Supporting Actress Golden Globe-winning performance
Films set on trains
Films whose writer won the Best Adapted Screenplay Academy Award
Films whose writer won the Best Screenplay BAFTA Award
Films with screenplays by Alvin Sargent
Dashiell Hammett
1970s English-language films
1970s female buddy films
1970s American films
1970s British films